The University Center of Brasília (UNICEUB) is a private university located in Brasília, the capital of Brazil. It is third largest University in Brasília.

To join the university they must pass a biannual "vestibular".

History
UNICEUB was created on 1968, it was offered four courses: Administration, Accounting, Laws, and History. From that date onwards, new courses were created to meet the scientific and cultural needs of society.

During this period of activity, the following courses were offered: Architecture, Education, Medicine, Psychology Civil Engineering, Nursery, International Relations, Biology and others.

Student life
The university has 37 undergraduate courses, and two postgraduate courses: Law and Psychology. UNICEUB have three campuses: two in Brasília and one in the region of Taguatinga.

See also 
 Brazil university rankings
 Universities and higher education in Brazil

References

External links 
 

Educational institutions established in 1968
1968 establishments in Brazil
Universities and colleges in Brasília
Private universities and colleges in Brazil